Thomas Gordon Poston (October 17, 1921 – April 30, 2007) was an American television and film actor. He starred on television in a career that began in 1950. He appeared as a comic actor, game show panelist, comedy/variety show host, film actor, television actor, and Broadway performer.

According to USA Today Life editor Dennis Moore, Poston appeared in more sitcoms than any other actor. In the 1980s, he played George Utley opposite Bob Newhart's character on the CBS sitcom Newhart, receiving three Emmy Award nominations for the role.

Early life 
Poston was born in Columbus, Ohio, to George and Margaret Poston. His father was a liquor salesman and dairy chemist.

After completing high school, Poston attended Bethany College in West Virginia, but did not graduate. While there, he joined the Sigma Nu fraternity. He joined the United States Army Air Forces in 1941. Accepted to officer candidate school and then graduating from flight training, Poston served as a pilot in the European Theater in World War II; his aircraft dropped paratroopers for the Normandy invasion.

Poston served in North Africa, Italy, France, and England. After his discharge, he began studying acting in New York City, graduating from the American Academy of Dramatic Arts.

Career 
In 1953, as Thomas Poston, he was cast as "Detective" in the film City That Never Sleeps. In 1957, Poston gained recognition as a comedic "Man in the Street" (along with his colleagues Louie Nye, Dayton Allen and Don Knotts) on The Steve Allen Show. For these performances, Poston won the 1959 Emmy Award for Best Supporting Actor (Continuing Character) in a Comedy Series. In the fall of 1959, when the Allen program moved west to Los Angeles, Tom remained in New York, appearing frequently on Broadway and television game shows.

His film career was limited, with appearances in films such as William Castle's Zotz! (1962), The Old Dark House (1963), Soldier in the Rain (1963), Cold Turkey (1971), The Happy Hooker (1975), Rabbit Test (1978), Up the Academy (1980) and Carbon Copy (1981). He was cast as Michael Carrington's uncle Tom Anderson in Grease 2 (1982), but his scenes were deleted.

However, his television career was expansive, covering the better part of five decades. When Mel Brooks submitted his idea for Get Smart to the ABC network, ABC wanted Poston for the lead role of Maxwell Smart. When ABC passed on the show, NBC picked it up and the lead went to Don Adams. Poston, however, made a guest appearance on the show as a KAOS villain. He appeared in Thriller during its second season in 1961. The episode, number six, was entitled "Masquerade" and starred Elizabeth Montgomery.

In 1968, Poston played the role of the Scarecrow, at The Municipal Opera Association of St. Louis, production of The Wizard of Oz. Lana Cantrell played Dorothy Gale, and Betty Low played the Sorceress of the North, also known as Glinda.

Poston was a recurring guest star on The Bob Newhart Show in the 1970s, playing "The Peeper," a buddy of Bob's since college. Whenever the Peeper came from Vermont to visit Newhart's Chicago-based character, Dr. Bob Hartley, the two middle-aged men would still try to one-up each other with practical jokes. Poston later played the role of Franklin Delano Bickley on Mork & Mindy.

A longtime friend of Bob Newhart, Poston played George Utley, a simple country handyman of the Stratford Inn, on Newhart, and appeared with Newhart in Cold Turkey as the town drunk, Edgar Stopworth. He was nominated for an Emmy Award three times for Outstanding Supporting Actor in a Comedy Series for his performance on Newhart in 1984, 1986, and 1987. He had a third role with Newhart in the short-lived Bob.

Poston had regular roles on many other television series: Family Matters, Murphy Brown, Home Improvement, Cosby, Malcolm & Eddie, ER, Grace Under Fire, That '70s Show (as Kitty Forman's father, Burt Sigurdson), Will & Grace, and guest starred in an episode of The Simpsons as the Capital City Goofball. He played dentist/jeweler, Art Hibke, on ABC's Coach, for which he was nominated for an Emmy for Outstanding Guest Actor in a Comedy Series in 1991. He guest-starred on Home Improvement as a surly airport clerk in Alpena, Michigan when Tim and Al get stuck there during a snowstorm on Christmas Eve, and again as that character's brother in the episode "The Tool Man Delivers", and again as the third brother in the episode "Thanksgiving".

In 2001, he appeared on The Lone Gunmen episode "The Cap'n Toby Show" and in King of the Hill episode "Now Who's The Dummy?" as Mr. Popper (voice). In 2005, he played the character "Clown" on the brief-lived NBC series Committed and guest-starred on the ABC series 8 Simple Rules as Rory's unlawful friend Jake in the episode "Good Moms Gone Wild". In 2006, Poston guest-starred on an episode of The Suite Life of Zack & Cody, entitled "Ah! Wilderness" as Merle, which was his final role.

Personal life and death 
Poston married Doris Sward in 1949. They later divorced.

He married Jean Sullivan in 1955. They had a daughter, Francesca (born 1956). Poston and Sullivan announced their separation in 1959 and divorced two years later.

Poston began dating Kay Hudson in the spring of 1961, when she was 17 and he was 39. The couple married in 1968. They had two children, son Jason Poston (born 1969) and daughter Hudson Poston (born 1972). They divorced in 1976 but remarried in 1980 and remained together until her death at age 54 in 1998 from ALS.

In 2001, Poston married actress Suzanne Pleshette, who played the wife of Newhart's character Bob Hartley on The Bob Newhart Show. It was his fourth marriage and her third. Pleshette and Poston had dated briefly in 1959 and got back together in 2000.

After a brief illness, Poston died of respiratory failure on April 30, 2007, in Los Angeles, California, at the age of 85. He pre-deceased Pleshette by nine months. Although he was not Jewish, he is interred in the Jewish Hillside Memorial Park Cemetery alongside Pleshette, who was Jewish.

Filmography

Films

Television

References

External links 

 Tom Poston interview at the Archive of American Television

1921 births
2007 deaths
American male film actors
American male stage actors
American male television actors
20th-century American male actors
Burials at Hillside Memorial Park Cemetery
Deaths from respiratory failure
Outstanding Performance by a Supporting Actor in a Comedy Series Primetime Emmy Award winners
Male actors from Columbus, Ohio
Military personnel from Ohio
United States Army Air Forces officers
United States Army Air Forces pilots of World War II
Bethany College (West Virginia) alumni